Mohan Singh Bisht (born 2 June 1957) is an Indian politician from Delhi, belonging to Bharatiya Janata Party (BJP). He is a Member of the Delhi Legislative Assembly from Karawal Nagar Vidhan Sabha constituency. He was elected successively in 1998, 2003, 2008, 2013, and 2020.

Early life
Bisht was born on 2 June 1957 to Khushal Singh Bisht and Hira Devi at Ajoli village, Almora district, Uttarakhand. He was attracted to politics at a young age, as he enjoyed seeing politicians visit his village in an effort to garner votes.

Political career

Affiliations
In 1976 he moved to Delhi and joined Bharatiya Jana Sangh, predecessor of the Bharatiya Janata Party. He joined the Hindu nationalist organisation Rashtriya Swayamsevak Sangh (English: National Volunteer Organisation) in 1992, becoming a swayamsevak. He is an active member of the Delhi unit of another Sangh Parivar constituent Vishwa Hindu Parishad (English: World Hindu Council).

Vidhan Sabha elections
He is a member of the Bharatiya Janata Party. He has repeatedly contested the Karawal Nagar Vidhan Sabha Constituency since 1998 and has lost the election just once in 2015 to Kapil Mishra.

He was elected for the Second Legislative Assembly of Delhi in 1998, defeating runner-up Zile Singh (Indian National Congress) by 23,191 to 20,133 votes. In the 2003 state assembly election, he defeated runner-up Hasan Ahmed (Indian National Congress) by a large margin of 15,227 votes. In the 2008 state assembly election, he further improved his margin of victory from the last election, winning against runner-up independent candidate Satan Pal Dayma by a margin of 21,128 votes. In 2013 state legislative assembly election, he received a tough fight from Kapil Mishra (Aam Aadmi Party), but finally won by a margin of 3083 votes.

2013 assembly election
He was appointed vice-president of the BJP's Delhi unit by the president Vijay Goel in May 2013. A First Information Report was registered against Bisht in October 2013 for alleged violation of model code of conduct.  On 7 November 2013, the Bharatiya Janata Party announced Bisht as the party's candidate from Karawal Nagar Constituency for the 2013 state legislative assembly election, held on 4 December. His main election issues included infrastructure development, inflation and corruption.

Personal life
Bisht married Laxmi Bisht on 13 April 1980; they have a daughter and a son. His family owns Adharshila Convent Public School, a senior secondary school in Karawal Nagar. His interests include social service and sports like football and kabaddi. He "loves" watching religious soap operas. He resides with his family at Dayal Pur Extension, North East Delhi. In 2006, his house at the time was demolished by the Municipal Corporation of Delhi as a part of sealing drive because it was "illegally" constructed.

External links
 Profile of Mohan Singh Bisht at Delhiassembly.nic.in
 Official website of the BJP Delhi

References

Living people
1957 births
Delhi MLAs 2008–2013
People from North East Delhi district
People from Almora district
Bharatiya Jana Sangh politicians
Bharatiya Janata Party politicians from Delhi
Delhi MLAs 2013–2015